The mayor of Featherston officiated over the Featherston Borough of New Zealand, which was administered by the Featherston Borough Council. The office existed from 1917 until 1989, when Featherston Borough was amalgamated into the South Wairarapa District Council as part of the 1989 local government reforms.

List of Mayors

References 

Featherston
Featherston
Featherston
Featherston, New Zealand